Daniel Edvardsen (born 31 August 1991) is a Norwegian footballer who plays as a defender for Sandnes Ulf.

Club career
Edvardsen was born in Harstad. He made his senior debut for Bodø/Glimt on 11 April 2015 against Molde; Bodø/Glimt lost 1–3. Edvardsen played for Harstad before he joined Bodø/Glimt.

Career statistics

References

1991 births
Living people
People from Harstad
Norwegian footballers
Eliteserien players
Association football defenders
FK Bodø/Glimt players
Sportspeople from Troms og Finnmark